Peter McGill (August 1789 – September 28, 1860) was a Scots-Quebecer businessman who served as the second mayor of Montreal, Canada East from 1840 to 1842.

Biography 

He was born Peter McCutcheon in the village of Creebridge, Wigtownshire (now Dumfries and Galloway) in Scotland. His parents were John McCutcheon and his second wife, Mary McGill. In 1821, he changed his name when he became the heir of his uncle John McGill, at the latter's request.

McGill held a seat in the Legislative Council of Lower Canada from 1832 to 1837, the Special Council of Lower Canada from 1838 to 1841, and the Legislative Council of the United Provinces from 1841 to 1860. 

McGill served as president of the Bank of Montreal from 1834 to 1860. He founded the first railway company in Canada in 1834.  It is he, rather than James McGill, who is depicted in the stained-glass mural in the McGill station of the Montreal metro, even though the station is named for its proximity to McGill University.

McGill was St. Andrew's Society of Montreal’s first president.

Rue Peter-McGill in Mercier-Hochelaga-Maisonneuve borough is named after him.

On his passing in 1860, Peter McGill was interred in Montreal's Mount Royal Cemetery. McGill had three sons with two surviving him:

 Snydeham Clitheroe McGill 1841-?? - joined as Ensign with the Royal Canadian Rifle Regiment (1859), Cheshire Regiment before becoming Staff-Adjutant (1883-1900) and also as acting Commandant at Royal Military College.

 John Shuter Davenport McGill 1839-?? - born in Montreal but spent rest of his life in England and served in the British Army's 60th King's Royal Rifle Corps

References

External links 
 

1789 births
1860 deaths
Pre-Confederation Canadian businesspeople
Bank of Montreal presidents
Businesspeople from Montreal
Members of the Legislative Council of Lower Canada
Members of the Special Council of Lower Canada
Members of the Legislative Council of the Province of Canada
Mayors of Montreal
People from Dumfries and Galloway
Scottish emigrants to pre-Confederation Quebec
Burials at Mount Royal Cemetery